Yueyanglou may refer to:

Yueyang Lou, or Yueyang Tower, an ancient Chinese tower in Yueyang, Hunan, China.
Yueyanglou District, a district in Yueyang, Hunan.
Yueyanglou Subdistrict, a subdistrict of Yueyanglou District, Yueyang.